"The Witch Queen of New Orleans" is a 1971 song by Redbone. The single was released from Redbone's third album Message from a Drum, which is also titled The Witch Queen of New Orleans in its European release. The song peaked at No. 2 in the United Kingdom and No. 21 in the United States.

Background
"The Witch Queen of New Orleans" is about a 19th-century practitioner of voodoo from New Orleans named Marie Laveau, referred to in the song lyrics as "Marie la Voodoo veau". The song was written by the two Native American brothers of the group Redbone, Lolly Vegas and Pat Vegas. It shows influences from New Orleans R&B and swamp pop.

The song was released in 1971 with "Chant: 13th Hour" as the B-side in the US. It debuted in the Billboard Hot 100 chart in November 1971 in the US where it reach a peak of  No. 21 in 1972 (chart date February 19, 1972). The song reached No. 2 in the UK single chart in October 1971 behind Rod Stewart's "Maggie May".

Charts

Weekly charts

Year-end charts

Chantoozies version

Australian group Chantoozies released a version of the song in 1987 as their debut single, retitled "Witch Queen". The song peaked at number 4 on the Australian Kent Music Report.

Track listings
7" single (K 208)
Side A "Witch Queen"
Side B "The Chantoozie Shuffle"

12" single ( X 14459)
Side A "Witch Queen"  (12" version) 
Side B1 "Witch Queen"  (7" version)  
Side B2 "The Chantoozie Shuffle"

Charts

Weekly charts

Year-end charts

Popular culture
Artist Howard Arkley produced a series of sketches in the early 1970s referencing popular songs, one of which is titled "Which Queen" as a reference to this song.

The song is commonly played during Halloween in the United States.

References

1971 songs
1971 singles
1987 debut singles
Ultratop 50 Singles (Flanders) number-one singles
Epic Records singles
Mushroom Records singles
Chantoozies songs
Songs about New Orleans
Songs about witches
Redbone (band) songs